The 2012 Giro d'Italia was the 95th edition of Giro d'Italia, one of cycling's Grand Tours. It started in the Danish city of Herning, and ended in Milan. The complete route of the 2012 Giro d'Italia was announced in mid October. For the first time since the 2007 edition no climbing time trial was included in the route. The colour of the jersey for the mountains classification was changed for this year's edition from green to blue. The move came at the behest of sponsor Banca Mediolanum, who renewed its support of the mountains classification for a further four years.

Hesjedal won the general classification by 16 seconds over runner-up Joaquim Rodríguez of Spain, representing  – the closest race-winning margin since Eddy Merckx beat Gianbattista Baronchelli by 12 seconds in the 1974 edition – who also won two stages and the points classification title, edging out  sprinter Mark Cavendish by one point. Third place was taken by 's Thomas De Gendt of Belgium, after he put in strong performances on the final two stages of the race; he won the race's queen stage, finishing at the high-point of the itinerary, at the Stelvio Pass and also finished in the top five of the time trial. As such, he gained sufficient time to move up from ninth to third over those stages, becoming the first Belgian rider to take a Grand Tour podium since Johan Bruyneel finished third at the 1995 Vuelta a España.

In the race's other classifications,  rider Rigoberto Urán of Colombia finished as the best rider aged 25 or under in the general classification, finishing in seventh place overall; the mountains competition was won by Italy's Matteo Rabottini of the  team, scoring almost double the number of points that his nearest rival in the standings accrued. Rabottini was the only Italian to feature on the podium, as for the first time since 1995, no Italian riders finished in the top three overall, as 's Michele Scarponi – the defending champion – could only finish fourth overall.

Teams

All 18 UCI ProTeams were automatically invited and were obliged to attend. In addition four UCI Professional Continental were announced in January 2012. The full list of participating teams is:

Pre-race favourites
2011 winner Alberto Contador was banned for two years on 6 February for doping during 2010 Tour de France and  therefore did not start in the Giro. Ivan Basso, winner of the Giro of 2006 and 2010, announced on 13 November 2011 that he was aiming for a third pink jersey.

Johan Bruyneel, manager of the new fusion team between Leopard-Trek and Team Radioshack, stated that it would be hard for three-time runner-up Andy Schleck and his brother Fränk Schleck to win the 2012 Tour de France because of the large number of kilometers against the clock. There was a chance that one of the brothers would target the Giro d'Italia instead. On 19 November 2011 Fränk initially announced that the Schleck brothers would not ride the Giro and will focus on the Tour despite the time trialing kilometers. Eventually on 29 April 2012 it was announced that Fränk Schleck would replace the injured Jakob Fuglsang as the team leader during the race.

On 17 April Michele Scarponi, winner of the 2011 edition after Contador's suspension, announced that he wanted to win the Giro on the road and not after a suspension of another rider. Scarponi teamed-up with Lampre–ISD teammate and 2004 Giro d'Italia winner Damiano Cunego. Cunego aimed for a high finish in the Giro and skipped the 2012 Tour de France due to the large amount of time trialing kilometers.

Other riders named as overall contenders were Ag2r–La Mondiale's John Gadret (third overall in the 2011 Giro d'Italia), 2011 Youth classification winner Roman Kreuziger of team Astana, Team Katusha's Joaquim Rodríguez (fourth overall in the 2011 Giro d'Italia) and the Venezuelan climber José Rujano of the Androni Giocattoli team.

Route and stages

The first three stages were announced on 5 October 2011, with the remaining stages announced on 16 October. On 18 April 2012 it was announced that the route for Stage 12 Seravezza to Sestri Levante had been altered because the coastal road through the Cinque Terre remains unusable following the severe landslides which struck the area on 25 October 2011.

The stages were divided into five categories of difficulty; category A, B for flat stages (from A for "stages presenting no particular difficulty"), category C for medium mountain stage, category D for mountain stages and category E for time trial stages. These categories were used to determine the time limit on the stage.

Classification leadership
In the 2012 Giro d'Italia, four different jerseys were awarded. For the general classification, calculated by adding each cyclist's finishing times on each stage, and allowing time bonuses for the first three finishers on mass-start stages, the leader received a pink jersey. This classification was considered the most important of the Giro d'Italia, and the winner was considered the winner of the Giro.

Additionally, there was a points classification, which awarded a red jersey. In the points classification, cyclists got points for finishing in the top 15 in a stage. Unlike in the better known points classification in the Tour de France, the type of stage had no effect on what points were on offer – each stage had the same points available on the same scale. The win earned 25 points, second place earned 20 points, third 16, fourth 14, fifth 12, sixth 10, and one point fewer per place down to a single point for 15th. In addition, points could be won in intermediate sprints.

There was also a mountains classification, the leadership of which was marked by a blue jersey. The jersey had been green since the jersey was first awarded, but with a sponsorship change, the jersey color was changed to blue. In the mountains classifications, points were won by reaching the top of a climb before other cyclists. Each climb was categorized as either first, second, third, or fourth-category, with more points available for the higher-categorized climbs. The Cima Coppi, the race's highest point of elevation, awarded still more points than the other first-category climbs. The Cima Coppi for the 2012 Giro d'Italia was the Stelvio Pass. The first rider to cross the Stelvio was Thomas De Gendt.

The fourth jersey represented the young rider classification, marked by a white jersey. This was decided the same way as the general classification, but only riders born after 1 January 1987 were eligible.

There were also two classifications for teams. In the Trofeo Fast Team classification, the times of the best three cyclists per team on each stage were added; the leading team was the team with the lowest total time; the Trofeo Super Team was a team points classification, with the top 20 placed riders on each stage earning points (20 for first place, 19 for second place and so on, down to a single point for 20th) for their team.

The rows in the following table correspond to the jerseys awarded after that stage was run.

Final standings

General classification

Points classification

Mountains classification

Young riders classification

Trofeo Fast Team classification

Trofeo Super Team classification

References

Citations

External links

 

 
Giro d'Italia by year
2012 in Italian sport
Giro d'Italia
May 2012 sports events in Europe